VGHS stands for Video Game High School, an American web series. It may also refer to:
 Shahjalal International Airport, the largest airport in Bangladesh
 Victoria Girls' High School, Grahamstown, South Africa
 Video Game High School, a fictional school within a web series by the same name
 Vista Grande High School, Casa Grande, Arizona, United States
 Vivian G. Harsh Society, an American literary society